HMS Bulldog is a Type 31 frigate of the Royal Navy and the eighth vessel named Bulldog. The name was selected to represent key themes that represent the future plans of the Royal Navy and Royal Marines.

Bulldog, named after the Second World War  , which escorted convoys in the Atlantic, was chosen to represent operations in the North Atlantic.  Bulldog  captured a German Enigma machine and associated codebooks that were on board U-boat .  Its capture enabled British intelligence to decipher German naval messages. The plan for the Type 31 project envisages all five units of the class being in service by February 2030.

References

Proposed ships of the Royal Navy
Type 31 frigates